Karola Obermueller (born 21 March 1977, Darmstadt) is a German composer and teacher.

Life 
Obermueller began her training at the Akademie für Tonkunst in Darmstadt. In 2010, she completed a doctorate at Harvard University in Cambridge, Massachusetts, where she studied with Mario Davidovsky, Bernard Rands, Julian Anderson, Chaya Czernowin, Magnus Lindberg, and Harrison Birtwistle. She has taught at Wellesley College and the Young Composers Program at the Cleveland Institute of Music. Since 2010, Obermueller has been one of the directors of the composition program at the University of New Mexico.

A portrait CD of hers was released as part of the WERGO Contemporary Music Edition by the German Music Council. She has received the Darmstädter Musikpreis and the Bayerischer Jugendpreis des Indien-Instituts München, as well as awards and commissions from the Fromm Foundation commission, the ASCAP Morton Gould Awards, and the Bohemians New York Musicians Club.  She did a residency at the Deutsches Studienzentrum in Venedig.

Obermueller frequently collaborates with her husband, American composer, Peter Gilbert. In addition to two operas, they have created an interactive installation piece called An Overlapping of Spaces, which combined a series of hanging surround-sound speaker arrays with unique iPod-based audience-interactivity. The work was featured as a centerpiece of the Perceiving Space in Art Gallery at the Davis Museum and Cultural Center between 2008 and 2010, which had previously chosen it as an Artwork of the Month. Their most recent collaboration, Listening to Mountains, was presented in Germany and Australia.

Obermueller and Gilbert teach together at the University of New Mexico and have two children.

Operas 
Obermueller's first opera, Dunkelrot ("Dark Red"), was written for the opera in Nürnberg after an original libretto by Gabriele Strassmann. The opera tells the tale of an African woman seeking asylum in Germany who gets lost in the German immigration system. Her second opera, Helges Leben ("Helge's Life"), was an adaptation of the eponymous play by Sibylle Berg, and was written with composer Mark Moebius.

Gilbert and Obermueller have collaborated on two operas. Their multi-media, electronic chamber opera, Dreimaldrei gleich unendlich ("Three times three equals eternity"), has been performed in Germany and the United States, including a premiere as part of the Musik der Jahrhunderte festival in Stuttgart. A prize-winner at the National Opera Association awards, their opera was included in an exhibition celebrating the 20th anniversary of the Center for Art and Media Karlsruhe. They also worked together on Robert S., an opera performed with Theater Bonn, with the composers Georg Katzer, Annette Schlünz, Peter Gilbert, and Sergej Newski. The complete opera is published by Ricordi.

Works

Stage works 
Robert S. (2011), opera for 4 singers, and chamber orchestra 
Helges Leben (2008/09)
dreimaldrei gleich unendlich (2009), opera for 4 singers, 2 actors, clarinet, cello, accordion, live electronics and live video 
Dunkelrot (Dark Red) (2005–2007), opera for 7 singers, actress, live electronics and chamber orchestra 
Protuberanzen II (2001/02) for trumpet, organ, violoncello, percussion and dancers
Protuberanzen I (2001) for trumpet, organ, violoncello and dancers
My name is Urlappi(1998/99), chamber opera for soprano, mezzo-soprano, violin, saxophone and percussion

Vocal works 
mass.distance.time (2010) for choir
Untergegangen der Mond (2008) for countertenor/bass and ensemble
in zwischen (in between / in the meantime) (2004) for soprano, recorder, 3 violas, 2 viola da gambas and harpsichord
Einseitige Dialogue(one-sided dialogues) (2000–2002), three for mezzo-soprano and piano
Three songs about love (1992–94) for mezzo-soprano, baritone, piano, marimbaphone and two violoncelli
The Gold (1999) for mezzo-soprano and percussion

Orchestra works 
Glaube. Merke Rolle. (2011) Hommage à Mauricio Kagel for 10 instruments and voice
Kohlenmonoxyd.Nachtstück (2006) for two sopranos, narrator, choir and nine instruments (flute, clarinet, horn, trombone, percussion, 2 violins, viola and violoncello)
helical (2005/2006) for chamber orchestra
Schalen (peels / shells) (2005) for orchestra
volatile (2003/2004/2005) for chamber orchestra
Im Vorraum (In the anteroom) (2000–2002) for orchestra

Chamber music 
Las cosas, unas conducen an otras (2002/08) for two flutes
Für Wilfried (2008) for horn solo, collaborative composition with Peter Gilbert
...silbern (2008) for bass flute solo
...und Licht sich breitet aufs Meer... (2008) Sapphic Stanzas for soprano saxophone and live electronics 
reflejos distantes (2006) for bass flute, bass clarinet, violin and violoncello
Red Lake Fields 2 (2002/2006) for flute, clarinet, violin, violoncello and percussion
will o' wisp (2006) for recorder, flute, bass-koto and accordion
WindKaskaden (2006) for clarinet and accordion
gegen.wind.stärken 1 (2005/2006) for great bass recorder and electronics
Nichts Fettes nichts Süßes. (Nothing Fat nothing Sweet.) (2001/2005) – in memoriam Clara & Robert Schumann – for clarinet, alto saxophone, piano and percussion
xs (2005) for string quartet
Knotenpunkte (points of knotting) (2005) for alto flute, clarinet, harp and string quartet
les sables mouvants(quicksand / drifting sand) (2004) for clarinet, piano, violin and violoncello
shraeng (2004) for two electric guitars, dedicated to the guitar duo 
but one adagio smile still lingers (2004) in memoriam Rose Ausländer for violoncello solo
Metamorphosen (metamorphoses) (since 2003) for oboe solo
Kalpa><Pralaya (2002) for bansuri, sitar, mridangam and orchestra 
Red Lake Fields (2001/02) for flute, clarinet, violin, violoncello and piano 
Protuberanzen II (2001/02) for trumpet, organ, violoncello, percussion and dancers
duo variabile I (2001/02) for flute and recorder
Protuberanzen I (2001) for trumpet, organ, violoncello and dancers
the great secret lies (2001) for pipa, kayagum and marimbaphone
....incalzando....(1999-01) cor anglais and organ
Music for recorder, harp and harpsichord (1999/00)
Five scraps of fury(1995–98) for piano solo
String Quintet 1997 (1996–98) for two violins, viola, violoncello and double-bass

CDs
 2018 Edition Zeitgenössische Musik
 2020 Voices of the Pearl, Vol. 3
 2020 Music for English Horn Alone

Video
Trailer for Dreimaldrei Gleich Unendlich
DW-TV
Listening to Mountains demo

Books 
Charlotte Martin: …denn Kunst meint ja immer ein Sich-Preisgeben. Drei Portraits. Darmstadt 2006.

Sources 
The University of New Mexico – Karola Obermueller

References

External links 
 

1977 births
20th-century classical composers
21st-century American composers
21st-century classical composers
American women classical composers
American classical composers
German women classical composers
Harvard University alumni
Hochschule für Musik Saar alumni
Living people
University of New Mexico faculty
20th-century German composers
20th-century American women musicians
20th-century American composers
21st-century German composers
21st-century American women musicians
German classical composers
20th-century women composers
21st-century women composers
American women academics
20th-century German women
21st-century German women